Attorney General Caldwell may refer to:

Alfred Caldwell Jr. (1847–1925), Attorney General of West Virginia
Aquilla B. Caldwell (1814–1893), Attorney General of West Virginia
Buddy Caldwell (born 1946), Attorney General of Louisiana
Clarence C. Caldwell (1877–1957), Attorney General of South Dakota